Nowe Wolkowo  is a village in the administrative district of Gmina Osieczna, within Leszno County, Greater Poland Voivodeship, in west-central Poland.

References

Nowe Wolkowo